Madhya Pradesh State Highway 36 (MP SH 36) is a State Highway running from Sendhwa town in Barwani district till Khetia (Madhya Pradesh-Maharashtra border).

It passes through Niwali and Pansemal.

See Also
List of state highways in Madhya Pradesh

References

State Highways in Madhya Pradesh